Cram is a surname, and may refer to

 Alastair Cram (1909–1994), Scottish mountaineer, lawyer and Second World War British Army officer
 Allen Gilbert Cram (1886–1947), American painter
 Bobby Cram (1939–2007), English footballer
 Cleveland Cram (1917–1999), American CIA station chief and historian
 Donald J. Cram (1919–2001), Nobel Prize–winning American chemist
 Edith Claire Cram (1880–1960), American peace activist and heiress
 Eloise Blaine Cram (1896–1957), American parasitologist
 George F. Cram (1842–1928), American map publisher
 George Henry Cram (1838–1872), Union Army colonel during the American Civil War
 Holly Cram (born 1984), Scottish field hockey player
 Jerry Cram (born 1947), American former baseball pitcher and coach
 Mildred Cram (1889–1985), American writer
 Ralph Adams Cram (1863–1942), American architect
 Ralph W. Cram (1869–1952), American newspaper publisher and aviator
 Scott Cram (born 1977), Australian-born former Scotland international rugby league footballer
 Steve Cram (born 1960), British former middle-distance runner
 Thomas J. Cram (1804–1883), American topographical engineer